Orujov Zahid Maharram oglu (born 1 February 1972) is an Azerbaijan politician, deputy of the National Assembly of the Republic of Azerbaijan ; chairman of the Board of the Social Research Center (2019).

Early life 
Zahid Oruj was born on 1 February 1972, in Aliismayilli village of Gadabey district. After graduating from high school with high marks, he was admitted to Azerbaijan Technical University in 1989, and in 1994 he finished his higher education with excellent marks.

In 1999–2000, he held the position of editor-in-chief of "Ana Vatan" newspaper.

He is a reserve officer. He knows Russian, Turkish and English languages.

He is married and has 2 children.

Scientific activity 
In 1994, after graduating from the Azerbaijan Technical University with excellent grades, he entered the graduate school of the Institute of Photoelectronics of the Azerbaijan National Academy of Sciences. Then he worked as a researcher at the Institute of Physics of the Azerbaijan National Academy of Sciences.

Also, he was one of the members of the 10-member outstanding student committee of Azerbaijan Technical University and a member of the scientific council of this higher educational institution for 5 years.

Political activity 
Starting from 1990, Zahid Oruj was recognized as one of the leaders of the active student organizations by closely joining the popular movement and the struggle for national liberation in Azerbaijan.

In 1992, continuing his active political life, he was elected the head of the press service and deputy for political affairs of the Motherland Party.

In 2001, 2005 and 2010, he was elected as a deputy of the National Assembly of the Republic of Azerbaijan of the II, III and IV convocations from Barda city constituency No. 93. He is a member of the Security and Defense Committee of the National Assembly. He is the head of the Azerbaijan-Uzbekistan interparliamentary relations working group, a member of the Azerbaijan-German Federal Republic, Azerbaijan-Belgium interparliamentary relations working groups. For 12 years in a row, he was awarded the prizes of many media organizations and public organizations as one of the 10 most active deputies of the "Union of Parliamentary Journalists" and the National Assembly of the Republic of Azerbaijan.

For 10 years, as a member of the relations group for the National Assembly of the Republic of Azerbaijan-NATO Parliamentary Assembly, he closely participated in the work of various international conferences and was recognized as the author of many reports and presentations.

On 12 August 2013, on his own initiative, he proposed his candidacy for the presidency of the Republic of Azerbaijan and submitted his documents to the CEC. For this reason, Zahid Oruj was removed from the party ranks at the meeting of the Central Control Inspection Commission of Motherland Party held on 15 August.

On 11 February 2019, by the order of the President of the Republic of Azerbaijan, he was appointed the chairman of the Board of the Social Research Center.

In the periodical press, he writes consecutive articles on geopolitics, regional and international politics, including the state and public life of Azerbaijan.

References

External links 

Azerbaijani politicians
Azerbaijani journalists
1972 births
Living people